Mirza Ghalib  is a 1954  Indian Hindi and Urdu language biographical film, directed by Sohrab Modi. Based on the life of well-known poet Mirza Ghalib, the film was acclaimed upon release. It stars Bharat Bhushan as Ghalib and Suraiya as his courtesan lover. The film won the President's Gold Medal for the All India  Best Feature Film and the President's Silver Medal for Best Feature Film in Hindi in the 2nd National Film Awards for 1954. Suraiya's singing (of Mirza Ghalib's ghazals)  and  her acting was specially applauded by the Prime Minister, Jawahar Lal Nehru, who remarked to her, "You have brought back Ghalib to life", in a special screening of the film at Rashtrapati Bhavan.

Story and Plot
The film depicts an episode in the life of famous poet Mirza Ghalib during the last Mogul King, Bahadur Shah Zafar's times. The story revolves around the love and admiration of Moti Begum, (named "Chaudhvin"(moon-faced) by Mirza Ghalib), played by Suraiya, for Mirza Ghalib, played by Bharat Bhushan, and its end in the tragic death of 'Chadhvin' (Suraiya).

Ghalib is already a married man, married to "Umrao Begum" (Nigar Sultana), who is a pious woman, in love with and in awe of her poet husband. Emperor Bahadur Shah "Zafar" (Iftekhar), himself a poet of considerable stature, is hosting a "mushaira" (poetry recitation session). At the "mushaira", the poetry of "Zauq" is much applauded; Mirza Asadullah Khan "Ghalib", on the other hand, finds no takers for his "ghazals" (poems). (In another scene, when ghalib is reciting out of court, even the general populace thinks his ghazals are too profound and his Urdu too difficult.) In the more intellectual environment of the mushaira, nobody except the Mufti (Murad) and the Kotwal, Hashmat Khan (Ulhas) can find anything to appreciate in Ghalib's poetry. The Mufti expresses his appreciation to Ghalib; the Kotwal spends his time hurriedly writing down the ghazal Ghalib has just recited. Ghalib instead of reciting melodiously as others do, starts by just "reading" his ghazals dryly (maybe he finds the poets below his calibre), and even calls himself a poet ("Sukhanver") par excellence in one of his ghazals. This irks some of the poets present, at which Ghalib walks out of the court.

On his way home, he hears a woman singing one of his own ghazals. The singer is Moti Begum (Suraiya), daughter of a retired courtesan (Durga Khote). Moti is mad about Ghalib's poetry, and even about the man himself, even though she has no idea what her favourite poet looks like. Ghalib, delighted that someone likes his poetry, knocks on Moti's door and is admitted. Ghalib is awestruck not just by her enthusiasm for his ghazals but also by her beauty, and addresses her as Chaudhvin Begum (chaudhvin means "full moon"). When he realises she does not know that he is Ghalib, he teases her by deprecating Ghalib's poetry. Moti, of course, leaps to her hero's defence and literally shoos the unexpected guest from her house. Right on Ghalib's heels (in fact, bumping into the poet in the doorway) comes another visitor to Moti's house: the Kotwal. He has just returned from the mushaira at the fort, bringing with him the transcript of the Ghalib ghazal he'd heard there. He hands over the ghazal to a grateful Moti, and astonishes her by identifying her recent guest as Ghalib himself.

A few days later, Ghalib comes across yet another person singing one of his ghazals. This time, it is a poor mendicant who, when questioned, tells Ghalib that Moti Begum teaches him these ghazals so that he can sing them to earn a few paisas. Ghalib, ego well fuelled, goes off to Moti Begum's house once again, and is welcomed with much ecstatic gushing by the woman, who has now taken to calling herself Chaudhvin Begum. She is shy and demure; he is soulful. But Chaudhvin Begum is just one aspect of Ghalib's somewhat troubled life. He may be a great poet, but that greatness is no  enough to keep the wolves from the door. One somewhat benevolent wolf is the moneylender Mathuradas (Mukri) to whom Ghalib owes a large sum of money. Mathuradas comes by every now and then, asking for the debt to be cleared; but Ghalib always manages to fob him off.

...and there is Ghalib's wife (Nigar Sultana), an extremely religious woman who is tormented by the fact that none of her children have survived beyond infancy. Her relationship with her husband is one of easy camaraderie; she is his staunch supporter, a wife who never cribs that they're forever in debt and who, even when she suspects that her husband is in love with another woman, does not protest or demand his love for herself. (Instead, she tells him to marry a second time). This is an intriguing woman; she can be surprisingly progressive at times, irritatingly dull at others, and even, occasionally, appealing and wise.

Right now, however, the one facing hard times is Chaudhvin Begum. The Kotwal, Hashmat Khan, has been lusting after her and has persuaded Chaudhvin's penurious mother to give her daughter in marriage to him. He has even paid a bride price of Rs 2,000 — and Chaudhvin's mother, despite all of Chaudhvin's protests, insists that the wedding will take place. In desperation, Chaudhvin writes a letter to Ghalib and sends it to him through her doorkeeper-cum-general dogsbody, a man with a taste for liquor. The man sets out for Ghalib's house on a Tuesday, wanders into a wine shop, and emerges on Thursday, leaving Ghalib very little time to devise any very effective plan to rescue Chaudhvin from this unwanted marriage. He decides to hand over Rs 2,000 to Chaudhvin's mother; but since he does not possess that much, he sets out to 'earn' it — by gambling. He is successful, and hurries off to hand over the sum to the money-grubbing old woman.

Old woman has, in the meantime, become a changed person, all because a desperate Chaudhvin has tried to commit suicide. Suddenly overcome by a fit of maternal affection, Chaudhvin's mother heaps recriminations on the head of the just-arrived Kotwal: he will not be married to Chaudhvin, not for all the gold in the world. Much arguing ensues, but the mother stands firm and the Kotwal is left fuming and vowing vengeance — mainly on Ghalib.

There is much to come, of course: the Kotwal's attempts to have his revenge on Ghalib; Ghalib's own growing love for Chaudhvin Begum, and his wife's increasing frustration — on the one hand, jealous of Chaudhvin Begum; on the other, wishing for her husband's happiness. And all of it played out against the background of a Delhi that's changing, even the de jure power of its puppet emperor now ceded to the British Resident.

Cast
 Bharat Bhushan as Mirza Ghalib
 Suraiya as Moti Begum / Chaudhvin
 Durga Khote as Moti Begum's Mother
 Ulhas as Kotwal Hashmat Khan
 Nigar Sultana as Umrao Begum (Ghalib's Wife)
  Jagdish Sethi as Umrao Begum's father 
 Indira Billi
 Indra Bansal
 Murad as Mufti Sadruddin 
 Mukri as Lala Mathuradas
 Iftekhar as Bahadur Shah Zafar
 Kumkum as Courtesan

Soundtrack
The music was composed by Ghulam Mohammed. The songs and ghazals were rendered by Suraiya, Mohammed Rafi and Talat Mahmood.

 "Dil - E - Nadan Tujhe" Suraiya and Talat Mahmood
 "Phir Mujhe Deeda-E-Tar" Talat Mahmood
 "Aah Ko Chahiye Ek Umar" Suraiya
 "Hai Bas Ke Har Ek Unke" Mohammed Rafi
 "Nukta Cheen Hai" Suraiya
 "Wahshat Hi Sahi" Talat Mahmood
 "Jahan Koi Na Ho" Suraiya
 "Yeh Na Thi Hamari Qismat" Suraiya

Awards
National Film Awards
 1954: National Film Award for Best Feature Film
 1954: National Film Award for Best Feature Film in Hindi
 Filmfare Awards
 Filmfare Award for Best Art Direction (B&W): Rusi K. Banker

Box office
Mirza Ghalib (1954 film) was the fourth film among the Top Earners at the Box Office in 1954.

References

External links
 

1954 films
1950s biographical drama films
1950s historical drama films
Indian biographical drama films
Best Feature Film National Film Award winners
1950s Hindi-language films
Ghalib
Films directed by Sohrab Modi
Best Hindi Feature Film National Film Award winners
Indian historical drama films
Films set in the Mughal Empire
Cultural depictions of Indian monarchs
1954 drama films
Saadat Hasan Manto
Indian black-and-white films